Temiraul (Temiravul) is a rural locality (a selo) and the administrative centre of Temiraulsky Selsoviet, Khasavyurtovsky District, Republic of Dagestan, Russia. The population was 3,771 as of 2010. There are 47 streets.

Geography 
Temiraul is located 31 km east of Khasavyurt (the district's administrative centre) by road. Kirovaul is the nearest rural locality.

References 

Rural localities in Khasavyurtovsky District